The Salutation Hotel is a hotel and restaurant in Perth, Perth and Kinross, Scotland. It is a Category B listed building dating to around 1810, with earlier embellishments and later alterations. It is said to be the oldest hotel building in Scotland.  It has expanded to occupy three neighbouring tenements, one to the right and two to the left.

The earliest building recorded on this site was a private house belonging to the Murray family. It operated as a coaching inn between 1699 and 1745, and was a resting point on the coach roads from Edinburgh and Glasgow to the south to Aberdeen and Inverness to the north. The current street elevation was constructed in the early 19th century, at which time the Venetian window was added by Sir Robert Reid, the King's architect in Scotland.

On 31 December 1745, a belated 25th birthday party for Bonnie Prince Charlie was held at the hotel.

The building's facade has distinctive painted Black Watch figures.

Inside, in room number 20, a stone fireplace is dated 1699. In the courtyard, to the rear, there is a stone dated 1619 bearing arms of the Earl of Moray.

David Bowie played a show at the hotel, in the Moncreiffe Suite, on 7 November 1969. The Beatles have also stayed at the hotel.

A renovation project of the hotel's exterior won the biennial Perth Civic Trust Award in 2016."Historic Perth property project nets award" – The Courier, 22 July 2016

Facilities
The hotel has a bar (Reid's Bar) and a restaurant (The Adam Restaurant).

Gallery

See also
 List of listed buildings in Perth, Perth and Kinross

References

External links

Hotels in Perth and Kinross
Listed buildings in Perth, Scotland
Hotel buildings completed in the 19th century
Listed hotels in Scotland
Category B listed buildings in Perth and Kinross
19th-century establishments in Scotland